RoboDoc is a 2008 American science fiction comedy film that is distributed by National Lampoon. The comedy was written by two medical doctors, brothers Doug and Scott Gordon M.D., and directed by Stephen Maddocks and co-produced by Donald Tynes. Sleazy lawyers and heartless insurance companies are spoofed in this medical comedy. The world premiere took place on Saturday May 10, 2008 at Hard Rock Live on the Universal City Walk. The film was released in the Orlando Market on Friday September 26, 2008.

Synopsis 
A film about a perfect android doctor. A malpractice lawyer begins to look at RoboDoc a different way. If he can't make a mistake, then there will be no malpractice happening and no one would get sued. So now, he tries to destroy RoboDoc for all it's worth.

See also 
RoboCop, the film that is parodied.

References

External links 
 Official Website
 Myspace page
 
 Press Release
 In NY Daily News
 In Central Florida Doctor

2008 films
2000s science fiction comedy films
2000s English-language films
National Lampoon films
American science fiction comedy films
2008 comedy films
2000s American films